"Vem vet" (in English: "Who knows") is a song in Swedish written and recorded by Lisa Ekdahl, and released as a single from her 1994 album, Lisa Ekdahl. The single peaked at number 4 in both Sweden and Norway. On the Eurochart Hot 100, "Vem vet" reached number 56. The song also charted at Svensktoppen for a total of 10 weeks between 12 March-14 May 1994, topping the chart on 9 April that year. The song received significant radio airplay in Sweden, Denmark and Norway throughout the year.

Charts

Weekly charts

Year-end charts

References

External links
 Information at Svensk mediedatabas

1994 singles
Lisa Ekdahl songs
Jazz songs
Swedish-language songs
1994 songs